Cryers Hill is a hamlet in the parish of Hughenden and in Buckinghamshire, England. It was formerly known as Ravensmere (sometimes 'Ravening').

The hamlet is sandwiched between Great Kingshill, Hughenden Valley and Widmer End. Its primary school is called Great Kingshill school  and the crematorium at Cryers Hill is called Hughenden Crematorium. This is located in Four Ashes Road.

The hamlet has a Post Office and Shop, Cryers Hill Post Office & Store.

The only pub within Cryers Hill is The White Lion, serving traditional ales and food.

The hamlet and surrounding area provided the setting for Kitty Aldridge's 2007 novel called "Cryers Hill". The book partly documents the significant expansion of housing in the area during the 1960s.

It is now a 74-room De Vere Venues hotel and conference centre.

In recent years, an apparition of the Green Man is alleged to have been sighted on at least two occasions at Cryers Hill.

References

External links
 The Green Man at Cryers Hill
 Guardian Review of "Cryers Hill" by Kitty Aldridge

Hamlets in Buckinghamshire